Petar Despotović (born 26 August 1988) is a Serbian professional basketball player for Žarkovo of the Second League of Serbia.

External links
 Petar Despotovic at eurobasket.com

1988 births
Living people
ABA League players
Basketball League of Serbia players
OKK Dunav players
KK Mega Basket players
KK Mornar Bar players
KK Vršac players
KK Lions/Swisslion Vršac players
KK Žarkovo players
MBK Handlová players
Point guards
Serbian expatriate basketball people in Bosnia and Herzegovina
Serbian expatriate basketball people in Slovakia
Serbian men's basketball players
Sportspeople from Pljevlja